Brown Hollow is a valley in Carter County in the U.S. state of Missouri.

Brown Hollow was named after James Brown, a pioneer citizen.

References

Valleys of Carter County, Missouri
Valleys of Missouri